Thipakdei is a khum (commune) of Koas Krala District in Battambang Province in north-western Cambodia.

Villages

 Samraog
 KanTuot
 Ra
 Chay Balangk
 Cheug Tenh
 Ta Thok
 Kouk Poun
 Boeng Snao
 Tuol Mtes
 Koun Prum
 Boeng Reang

References

Communes of Battambang province
Koas Krala District